Archery is an mandatory sport at the Universiade that has been contested as optional sport between 2003 and 2015, and after 2017 became a compulsory sport. Unlike the Olympic competition, both recurve and compound disciplines are competed.

Summary

Events

Recurve

Compound

Editions

Medalists

Recurve

Men's individual

Men's team

Women's individual

Women's team

Mixed team

Compound

Men's individual

Men's team

Women's individual

Women's team

Mixed team

Medal table 
Last updated after the 2019 Summer Universiade.

Notes

References 

Sports123

 
Sports at the Summer Universiade